Valentin Smirnov (22 April 1887 Petserimaa, Pskov Governorate – ?) was an Estonian politician. He was a member of IV Riigikogu.

References

1887 births
Members of the Riigikogu, 1929–1932
Year of death missing